Umesh Vasan Parag (born 15 August 1971) is a former field hockey player from New Zealand, who finished in eighth position with the Men's National Team, nicknamed Black Sticks, at the 1992 Summer Olympics in Barcelona, Spain. He won a silver medal with the team at the 2002 Commonwealth Games in Manchester. Parag plays locally for Wellington, and was also a member of the national squad competing at the 2004 Summer Olympics. He was born and raised in Wellington.

External links
 
 New Zealand Olympic Committee
 

New Zealand male field hockey players
Field hockey players at the 1992 Summer Olympics
Field hockey players at the 1998 Commonwealth Games
1998 Men's Hockey World Cup players
Field hockey players at the 2002 Commonwealth Games
2002 Men's Hockey World Cup players
Field hockey players at the 2004 Summer Olympics
Olympic field hockey players of New Zealand
Commonwealth Games silver medallists for New Zealand
Field hockey players from Wellington City
1971 births
Living people
New Zealand sportspeople of Indian descent
Commonwealth Games medallists in field hockey
Medallists at the 2002 Commonwealth Games